Amy Ruman (born January 30, 1974) is an American racing driver. She is a two-time champion (2015, 2016) of the Trans-Am Series, at its top level, "TA," which completed its 50th anniversary season in 2016. She is also the only female to win the series championship.  Ruman is an Ohio native and a graduate of Kent State University.

Formative years
Amy Ruman is the daughter of former Trans-Am Series driver Bob Ruman, who competed in the series during the 1990s and the early 2000s. Bob started competitive automobile competition in autocross in 1963 at age 21. Early on he focused on Corvette autocross and drag racing. He moved into wheel-to-wheel with the Sports Car Club of America (SCCA) to win the SCCA Northeast Division GT1 championship. Bob entered Trans Am in the 1990s and still ranks in the top twenty drivers for most race starts with 95, topped by a third-place podium finish during the 2000 Long Beach Grand Prix weekend.

Amy's mother Barbara was also a competitive Corvette autocross driver for three decades, and both Amy and her sister Niki competed in racing starting as teenagers.

Early career
Amy Ruman began racing in 1992 at age 18 driving a Corvette in autocross events. She graduated to wheel-to-wheel racing in 1995 in SCCA with Spec Racer Ford, eventually scoring a regional championship in 1999. This earned her an invitation to Lyn St. James' Women's Global GT series running Don Panoz cars.

Amy continued to progress to more advanced levels of racing to enter SCCA National Championship Runoffs races with her father's Corvette in the GT-1 class. She qualified for the SCCA national run-offs nine times from 2003-2012 with a best finish of third in 2010. During this period she entered her first Trans-Am races with a total of three starts in 2005 and 2006 managing top-10 finishes on each of those occasions. The series was struggling financially at that juncture and went on hiatus in 2007 and 2008. Note that Trans-Am ran only two exhibition races in 2006, both at Topeka Heartland Raceway, where Ruman finished 4th and 5th.

Trans Am Series
Ruman Racing stepped up their involvement in Trans-Am with Amy upon the revitalization of the series in 2009. There were no Trans-Am races held during 2007 or 2008. Amy competed in five of the eight races in 2009 and secured 10th in the points championship. She improved to a fifth-place overall the following year after entering six of ten races. The 2011 season was a breakthrough year for Amy as she became the first woman driver to win a Trans-Am race with victory in the final round at Road Atlanta on September 30.
 This success contributed to her continued improvement in the points championship as she finished third. Two more race wins followed in 2012 to help her earn the runner-up spot in the season championship. By this time she was entered in all Trans-Am races throughout the year. With no race wins in 2013, her championship placing slipped to fifth. In 2014 Ruman achieved a victory at the season finale at Daytona International Speedway. This helped her secure third place in the championship.

In 2015 Amy earned her distinction as the first female Trans-Am champion by winning eight of 12 races on the series schedule. In 2016, Ruman attained three race wins and multiple podium finishes during the season.  This led her to her second consecutive championship title in Trans-Am’s 50th anniversary season.

Career Statistics

References 

http://rumanracing.com/driver-bob-ruman/, Background on Bob Ruman.
https://www.scca.com/articles/2004548-ruman-repeats-as-trans-am-champion-with-daytona-victory, Amy Ruman profile by SCCA.
http://www.specracer.com/, Spec Racer Ford background.
https://www.nytimes.com/1999/04/23/automobiles/a-series-of-their-own.html, New York Times, April 23, 1999, Background on St. James-Panoz driving program.

1974 births
Living people
Racing drivers from Ohio
American female racing drivers
Trans-Am Series drivers
SCCA National Championship Runoffs participants
21st-century American women